Graeme Murray (born 14 December 1984, in Bracebridge) is a Canadian ice sledge hockey player. He contracted a virus when he was three, which spread to his spinal cord, causing paralysis.

He made his debut for Canada's national team aged 15, and in 2002 was the team's youngest member at the 2002 Salt Lake City Winter Paralympic Games.

In 2014 Murray retired from competition to move back to his hometown of Gravenhurst, Ontario. Since then he has been actively engaged in the community and won a seat on the town council during the Ontario Municipal Elections in October of 2018.

Honours
2014 Winter Paralympics
Bronze in ice sledge hockey
2013 IPC Ice Sledge Hockey World Championships
Gold
2012 IPC Ice Sledge Hockey World Championships
Bronze
2010 Winter Paralympics
4th place in ice sledge hockey
2009 IPC Ice Sledge Hockey World Championships
Bronze
2008 IPC Ice Sledge Hockey World Championships
Gold
2006 Winter Paralympics
Gold in ice sledge hockey
2004 IPC Ice Sledge Hockey World Championships
4th place
2002 Winter Paralympics
4th place
 The Centennial Centre in Gravenhurst, ON was renamed The Graeme Murray Arena in honour of Murray in 2014.

External links
 Graeme Murray Personal Page
 Profile at the Canadian Paralympic Committee
 Profile at Hockey Canada
 Profile at Vancouver 2010 
 
 

1984 births
Living people
Canadian sledge hockey players
Paralympic sledge hockey players of Canada
Paralympic gold medalists for Canada
Paralympic bronze medalists for Canada
Ice sledge hockey players at the 2002 Winter Paralympics
Ice sledge hockey players at the 2006 Winter Paralympics
Ice sledge hockey players at the 2010 Winter Paralympics
Ice sledge hockey players at the 2014 Winter Paralympics
Medalists at the 2006 Winter Paralympics
Medalists at the 2014 Winter Paralympics
People from Gravenhurst, Ontario
People from Bracebridge, Ontario
Paralympic medalists in sledge hockey